On Fertile Lands is a 1980 Turkish drama film, directed by Erden Kıral based on a story by Orhan Kemal, featuring Tuncel Kurtiz as the head of a group of day labourers looking for work in the Çukurova region. "The story," according to Rekin Teksoy, "became a legend about village farm labourers, their merciless conditions, their hopes, their pain and their goldenhearts." It won Grand Jury Prize for Best Screenplay at the Strasbourg Film Festival and two Golden Oranges at the 18th Antalya Golden Orange Film Festival.

Awards
Strasbourg Film Festival
Grand Jury Prize for Best Screenplay: Erden Kıral (won)
18th Antalya Golden Orange Film Festival
Golden Orange for Best Director: Erden Kıral (won)
Golden Orange for Best Supporting Actor: Yaman Okay (won)

References

External links

Films set in Turkey
1980s Turkish-language films
1980 drama films
1980 films
Turkish drama films